EduBirdie is a professional writing and academic aid platform that offers services, including ghostwriting, essay creation, proofreading, and a plagiarism checker.

History 
EduBirdie was founded in 2015 by Plan B Services LLC registered under US Law.

Client engagement is estimated at over 500,000 users per month. EduBirdie services include plagiarism and grammar checking tools, citation generators, editing, proofreading, and others.

Besides the international version aimed at the US market, the platform is available in its local variations in the UK and Canada. It provides students with writing samples and research assistance to help them perfect their essay writing skills. Furthermore, EduBirdie does not tolerate plagiarism.

In 2019, EduBirdie started to operate under a new owner, I3 Technology Ltd to bring the company a new business model. Later that year, EduBirdie partnered with CHADD and donated from every order to help children with ADHD syndrome.

After numerous spelling-related accusations on Twitter, EduBirdie offered to proofread Donald Trump's tweets free of charge to prevent grammatical mistakes.

In 2019 EduBirdie.com unveiled EduBRIDIE, a service to provide professional support for brides, grooms and wedding party members writing vows and speeches.

Work process

Structure 
EduBirdie connects users with writers through an auction process, where writers bid on the proposals available. Unlike the majority of freelance platforms, each writer is chosen and hired directly by the company through an internal multi-step process:
 Registration
 Test writing
 Essay testing
 Document verification.

Tools 
One of the company's work areas is the development of free tools for different types of students. They include:
 Plagiarism Checker
 Grammar Checker
 Citation, Topic, Thesis and other Generators
 Complex correction tool (currently in beta).
 Paraphrasing Tool
 Words to Minutes, Words to Pages and Case Converters
 Word Counter
 Alphabetizer
 GPA Calculator
 Essay Rewriter

Reception

Perceptions 
EduBirdie is also an employer to college students, offering post-college jobs and ambassador programs for current students.

In 2020 EdSurge reported that EduBirdie is part of a new larger industry of contract cheaters, where sites like EduBirdie connect clients with freelance writers for cheating activities.

Marketing 
In 2018, EduBirdie promoted itself through social media influencers and YouTubers which led to an investigation conducted by BBC that resulted in thousands of videos being removed from YouTube which were promoting EduBirdie and cheating. It was done over an academic aid policy of YouTube where students pay to get help in academic related tasks which is considered as cheating. As per BBC those videos earned a total of 700 million views and almost 250 channels who were promoting homework cheating.

Researches 
 In 2019, EduBirdie offered to proofread President Trump's tweets, free of charge over grammatical mistakes in his Tweets.
 Hangover Test (U.S. National Beer Day on April 7, 2021). The study aims to figure out which brands of beer have the smallest impact on a person's productivity the morning after a big night out. They're looking to recruit 28–40 participants to drink the 15 most popular American beer brands and then see what they're capable of the following day, while hungover.
 How Gen-Z Is Spending Their Time While Quarantined. Gen-Z is trying to do their part by staying home and social-distancing to help slow the spread of COVID-19. However, not leaving the house day after day can get boring. EduBirdie staff surveyed their users to find out what exactly the younger generation is doing to occupy their time.
 United States cheating patterns. Global research has revealed nationwide study patterns, uncovering that English is the country's most cheated on subject. A new study, conducted by EduBirdie, analyzes the topics of essays written by external authors for students to turn in as their own during university and college courses.
 Zodiac signs and cheating. This survey showed how many people of each astrological sign have ever cheated or have come close to cheating in the relationship. As a result, it was shown that Leos are most likely to cheat on their partner (36% of the respondents), while Virgos are the most loyal (only 6% of cheaters).
 EduBirdie analysed over 500,000 words in essays submitted for editing to find out which words are most commonly misspelled in student essays.
 Studying Songs Research. By analyzing 500,000 songs in playlists tagged for studying, EduBirdieEduBirdie found out which songs and artists are the most suitable for studying.
 EduBirdie analyzed current ruling monarchs and their families to find out which universities are the most famous among royalty. The study showed that the University of Oxford has the biggest number of still living graduates from royal families.
 The Most Successful College Dropouts. The study aimed to show people who didn't finish their education but still became successful according to Forbes billionaires list.
 In July 2021 EduBirdie was looking to hire Smart Watchers, people who would watch Netflix and Amazon Prime TV series to be a part of the study that shows which of the most popular series motivate people to study the most.

See also 
 Copyright
 Author editing
 Content similarity detection
 Academic dishonesty
 Comparison of anti-plagiarism software
 LanguageTool
 Natural language processing
 Foreign language writing aid

References 

Education companies established in 2015
Internet properties established in 2015
Plagiarism detectors
Ghostwriting in science